Chen Shimei is a Chinese opera character and a byword in China for a heartless and unfaithful man. He was married to Qin Xianglian, also translated as Fragrant Lotus. Chen Shimei betrayed Qin Xianglian by marrying another woman, and tried to kill her to cover up his past. This fictional couple are also popular in legends.

History

“Illustrated Edition of Bao Zheng’s Trials of A Hundred Legal Cases” (增像包龙图判百家公案), “Bao Zheng’s Cases” (包公案) in short, published in 1595 had already had the story of Chen Shimei whose children's names were as the same as they are in the traditional opera.

The character was based on the historical court records of the Qing dynasty government official Chen Shumei (陳熟美), whose wife was Qin Xinglian (秦馨蓮). Like Bao Zheng, Chen was an upright official who eventually became an enemy of other corrupted officials. These officials created two fictitious husband-and-wife characters based on the couple by changing the middle Chinese characters of their real names and brought Bao Zheng of the Song dynasty era into their fictitious story to slander and smear Chen Shumei and his wife Qin Xinglian.

Qin Xianglian first appeared as Lady Qin (秦氏) without a given name (like most women recorded in imperial China's literature) in the 1594 story collection Legal Cases of A Hundred Families Judged by Dragon-Design Bao (包龍圖判百家公案), Story 26, "Lady Qin's Ghost Return to Exile Shimei" (秦氏還魂配世美). In this version, she was killed by Chen's assassins, but her ghost sought justice with "Dragon-Design Bao" or Bao Zheng. The story most familiar to modern people no longer contained superstition, and instead had Chen's assassin Han Qi (韓琪) commit suicide to let Qin escape.

Chinese opera
The story of Beijing opera “[Chen Shi] Mei’s Beheading Case” (铡美案)：

In the Song Dynasty, Chen Shimei (陈世美) was a poor scholar studying for the imperial examinations. Chen Shimei was married to Qin Xianglian (秦香蓮), who took care of him, his parents, and their children so Chen Shimei had time to study. When the time for the examinations came, Shimei went to the capital to take them, leaving Xianglian and their children behind. He did not return. In the meantime, a famine hit the country and killed their parents. With nothing left in the countryside, Xianglian and the children traveled to the capital to look for Shimei.

It turned out that Shimei had placed first in the examinations and had been awarded an official post as a result. The Emperor favored him, and offered to marry his sister to Shimei. Although Shimei was already married, he coveted wealth and power; he kept his previous marriage a secret and married the princess, hoping to forget about Xianglian and their children. This put Shimei in a bind when Xianglian came to the capital to look for him. Still, aware that his position was in danger plus that he had lied to the Emperor to marry the princess, Shimei not only claimed to not know Xianglian and their children, but also secretly ordered his bodyguard Han Qi (韩琪) to murder them.

Han Qi cornered Xianglian outside the capital. However, when Xianglian begged Han Qi to raise her children after her death, Han Qi could not bring himself to kill them. Caught between his conscience and duty, Han Qi committed suicide in Sanguantang (三官堂). After burying Han Qi, Xianglian then approached Bao Zheng to force Shimei to recognize her. Bao Zheng sent a subordinate to Shimei and Xianglian's hometown, verifying Xianglian's story. He then planned to have Xianglian confront Shimei in court, and tried to give Shimei another chance to recognize Xianglian as his first wife, for their children's sake. Instead, Shimei again denied knowing Xianglian. When Shimei denied sending an assassin to kill Xianglian as well, Xianglian proved that Shimei was lying by showing the court Han Qi's sword. Bao Zheng convicted Shimei for attempted murder and for lying to the Emperor, the punishment for which was death.

When the princess heard of the impending execution, she was aggrieved that Shimei had lied to her, but also did not want to become a widow. Therefore, she went with her mother, the Empress Dowager, to pressure Bao Zheng to stop the execution. Bao Zheng refused. However, when the Emperor issued an edict pardoning Shimei, Bao Zheng was left with no choice but to obey. Lamenting that justice would not be served, he offered Xianglian some money and planned to resign from office. Xianglian refused the gift, crying so hard about how the officials were shielding each other that she fainted. Ordering his subordinates to help Xianglian, Bao Zheng indignantly resolved to proceed with the execution in spite of the edict. When the Empress Dowager pointed out that the penalty for defying an imperial edict was also death, Bao Zheng took off his official headwear and declared that Shimei should be executed first before himself. Shimei was executed. Afterwards, peasants throughout the country gave Bao Zheng the honorific "Justice Bao" (包青天).

After the foundation of the People's Republic of China, Changchun Film Studio (長春電影製片廠) produced the colorful opera film “Qin Xianglian” in 1964 to preserve the stagecraft of Beijing opera performers such as Zhang Junqiu (張君秋), Ma Lianliang (馬連良), Li Duokui (李多奎) and Qiu Shengrong (裘盛戎).

Chen's portrayal in film and television 
 Li Lihua in The Story of Ching Hsiang-lien (1964)
 Leanne Liu in Justice Pao (1993)
 Hao Lei in The New Case of Beheading Chen Shimei (2004)
 Chen Ting in Justice Bao (2008)
 Zhou Zihan in Female Constable (2011)
 Mabel Yuan in Qin Xianglian (2011)

See also 
 Bao Zheng

References

Bibliography
 “A Hundred Legal Cases of Bao Zheng’s Cases”, Chapter 26, ‘Qing Xianglian’s Revial from the Death’ 
 
 

Cultural depictions of Bao Zheng
Fictional Chinese people in literature
Fictional criminals
Fictional Song dynasty people
Fictional Han people